"A Precious Little Thing Called Love" is a song written and composed by Lou Davis and J. Fred Coots. The song was published in 1928 by Remick Music Corp., in New York, NY. This song was chosen out of 150 submissions by Paramount for the theme song of the Gary Cooper film A Shopworn Angel. It was recorded by George Olsen and his Orchestra, The Ipana Troubadours, and Annette Hanshaw.

The sheet music can be found at the Pritzker Military Museum & Library.

References

Bibliography
Tyler, Don. Hit songs, 1900-1955: American popular music of the pre-rock era. Jefferson, N.C.: McFarland, 2007. . 

1928 songs
Songs written by Lou Davis
Songs with music by John Frederick Coots